The Savill Garden is an enclosed part of Windsor Great Park in England, created by Sir Eric Savill in the 1930s. It is managed by the Crown Estate and charges an entrance fee.
The garden includes woodland, ornamental areas and a pond. The attractions include the New Zealand Garden, the Queen Elizabeth Temperate House and trees planted by members of the Royal Family. In June 2010, a new contemporary rose garden designed by Andrew Wilson and Gavin McWilliam of Wilson McWilliam Studio  was opened by Queen Elizabeth II.

Eric Savill (1895–1980) was the grandson of Alfred Savill the founder of a large firm of estate agents and was involved in managing Windsor Great Park from 1930 to 1970, being Director of Gardens from 1962 to 1970. He opened the Savill Garden to the public in 1951 and left it as a heritage to the nation.

In June 2006, a specially designed new visitor centre, the Savill Building by Glenn Howells Architects was opened. The timber for the floor and roof came from the Windsor Estate.

The Savill Garden and the nearby Valley Gardens are Grade I listed on the Register of Historic Parks and Gardens.

References

External links

Grade I listed parks and gardens in Surrey
Windsor Great Park